A Zoo in My Luggage by British naturalist Gerald Durrell is the story of Durrell's 1957 animal collecting trip to British Cameroon, the northwestern corner of present-day Cameroon. First published in 1960, it is one of a half-dozen books about animal collecting trips that Durrell wrote.

The book tells the story of when Durrell went to the Cameroons and spent six months collecting various animals, referred to as "beef" in Pidgin English. He took part in various expeditions, including catching a python in a narrow cave, encountering a hippopotamus while traveling on the Cross River, and so on. It is his third book describing trips to the region, following The Overloaded Ark and The Bafut Beagles.

Illustrations by Ralph Thompson.

Books by Gerald Durrell
1960 non-fiction books
Books about Cameroon
1957 in British Cameroon
Novels set in zoos
British travel books
English non-fiction books
Rupert Hart-Davis books